Goianésia Esporte Clube, commonly known as Goianésia, is a Brazilian football club based in Goianésia, Goiás state.

History
The club was founded on March 28, 1955. They won the Campeonato Goiano Série B in 1985.

Achievements

 Campeonato Goiano Série B:
 Winners (1): 1985

Stadium
Goianésia Esporte Clube play their home games at Estádio Valdeir José de Oliveira. The stadium has a maximum capacity of 3,500 people.

References

Association football clubs established in 1955
Football clubs in Goiás
1955 establishments in Brazil